Cole Harbour  is a provincial electoral district in  Nova Scotia, Canada, that elects one member of the Nova Scotia House of Assembly.

In 1978, Halifax Cobequid was divided into four separate ridings, one of which was named Cole Harbour. Upon the recommendations of the 1992 Electoral Boundaries Report, the riding was split into Cole Harbour-Eastern Passage and Dartmouth-Cole Harbour. The district of Cole Harbour was re-created in the 2003 redistribution and was composed of 78 percent of Dartmouth-Cole Harbour and 29 percent of Cole Harbour-Eastern Passage. In 2012, following the Electoral Boundaries Commission review, this district was renamed Cole Harbour-Portland Valley and it lost a portion of the Westphal area to Preston-Dartmouth and gained the area east of Bell Lake from Dartmouth East and the Portland Hills area from Dartmouth South-Portland Valley. Following the 2019 electoral boundary review, the riding reverted back to its former name of Cole Harbour, while losing territory to the new riding of Cole Harbour-Dartmouth, exchanging some territory with Preston-Dartmouth (re-named Preston) and gaining territory from Eastern Shore and Cole Harbour-Eastern Passage.

Geography

Members of the Legislative Assembly
This riding has elected the following Members of the Legislative Assembly:

Election results

1978 general election

1981 general election

1984 general election

1988 general election

2003 general election

2006 general election

2009 general election

2013 general election

|-
 
|Liberal
|Tony Ince
|align="right"| 4,002
|align="right"| 41.03
|align="right"|N/A
|-
 
|New Democratic Party
|Darrell Dexter
|align="right"| 3,981
|align="right"| 40.82
|align="right"|N/A
|-
 
|Progressive Conservative
|Greg Frampton
|align="right"| 1,769
|align="right"| 18.14
|align="right"|N/A  
|}

2017 general election

2021 general election

References

External links
October 8, 2013 Nova Scotia General Election Results - Cole harbour-Portland Valley
2006 riding profile
June 13, 2006 Nova Scotia Provincial General Election Poll by Poll Results
2003 riding profile

Nova Scotia provincial electoral districts
Politics of Halifax, Nova Scotia